Amber Alyssa Tuccaro (3 January 1990 – disappeared 18 August 2010) was a Canadian First Nations woman from Fort McMurray, Alberta who went missing in 2010. Tuccaro was last seen near Edmonton, hitchhiking with an unidentified man. Her remains were found in 2012. , her case is still unsolved.

The Royal Canadian Mounted Police investigation of her disappearance was sharply criticized by the Tuccaro family, who alleged that police downplayed their concerns. A federal review released in 2018 found that the RCMP's investigation was "deficient" and "did not comply with procedures and guidelines".

Her case is among the high number of missing and murdered Indigenous women of Canada.

Background
Amber Tuccaro was born in 1990 in Alberta, Canada. She was a member of the Mikisew Cree First Nation. At the time of her disappearance, she was living in Fort McMurray, Alberta with her mother and 14-month-old son.

Disappearance
On August 17, 2010, Tuccaro flew from her home in Fort McMurray to Edmonton with her infant son and a female friend for a short vacation. The group booked a hotel in nearby Nisku.

Tuccaro was last seen the following day on August 18, 2010 at about 8 p.m. when she accepted a ride into Edmonton from an unknown man. She received a phone call during the ride in which the male driver can be heard in the background assuring Tuccaro that they are heading east on a back road towards Edmonton. Police believe the man actually drove south into rural Leduc County.

Police released a recording of the phone call in 2012. Tuccaro can be heard in the recording telling the driver, "You'd better not be taking me anywhere I don’t want to go." Investigators continue to seek the assistance of the public to identify the voice of the driver.

Tuccaro's remains were discovered by horseback riders on 1 September 2012 in a field in Leduc County. Her remains were positively identified by dental records.

Criticism of RCMP investigation
On 4 September 2010, a press release from the RCMP said they did not believe Tuccaro was in any danger. The family felt the RCMP were not taking her disappearance seriously, and that investigators were applying stereotypes about Indigenous women towards Tuccaro.

After Tuccaro's remains were found on 1 September 2012, her family said police rarely shared updates about the murder investigation. Her brother, Paul Tuccaro, was told by police that they had waited a year before releasing the audio of Tuccaro and the unknown man to the public and media.

Tuccaro’s family filed a complaint with the Civilian Review and Complaints Commission for the Royal Canadian Mounted Police in 2014. The independent review of the RCMP's investigation released a 120-page report in August 2018.

The commission concluded the RCMP's investigation was "deficient in that various members were either not properly trained or did not adhere to their training and that various members did not comply with procedures and guidelines."

The report found the RCMP did not begin investigating Tuccaro's disappearance until a month after she was reported missing. Police initially told her family that Tuccaro was "probably out partying" and needed to wait 24 hours. It also took four months before RCMP officers investigating the disappearance conducted any interviews, which the commission described as "unreasonable and unexplained."

Tuccaro was eventually listed as a missing person, but was removed from the list based on unconfirmed sightings. She was put back on the list on September 23, 2010, but no apology was made to the family. The report said removing Tuccaro  from the missing persons database was an "erroneous decision."

The RCMP was heavily criticized for not contacting or interviewing a woman who travelled with Tuccaro from Fort McMurray to Edmonton. This person, whose name was redacted in the report, was never considered a person of interest.

A suitcase with Tuccaro's belongings was also accidentally destroyed after it was recovered from her Nisku motel room. The report said a constable and corporal with the Leduc RCMP detachment, whose names were redacted, “failed to properly follow policy or reasonable investigative practices for securing seized property.”

Deputy Commissioner Curtis Zablocki apologized to the family 11 months after the report was released on July 25, 2019 and said the RCMP's investigation "was not our best work." The family rejected Zablocki's apology.

See also
List of solved missing person cases

References

External links
 

1990 births
2010 in Alberta
2010s missing person cases
2010 murders in Canada
Deaths by person in Canada
Edmonton
Female murder victims
Formerly missing people
Missing person cases in Canada
Murder in Alberta
Unsolved murders in Canada
Violence against Indigenous women in Canada
Women in Alberta
People from Fort McMurray